Sumbul or Sumbal is a given name of Arabic origin from Muskroot, it may refer to:

 Sumbal, Jammu and Kashmir, a town of Jammu and Kashmir
 Muskroot or Sumbul, a drug derived from the Uzbek plant Ferula sumbul
 Sumbala, an African cuisine
 Sumbul Iqbal (born 1990), Pakistani actress and model
 Sumbulovac, a village of Pale, Bosnia and Herzegovina